A massacre is an event with a heavy death toll.

Massacre may also refer to:

Arts, entertainment, and media

Fictional characters
Massacre (DC Comics), a DC Comics villain
Massacre (Marvel Comics), a Spider-Man villain

Films
Massacre (1934 film), a drama film starring Richard Barthelmess
Massacre (1956 film), a Western film starring Dane Clark
Massacre (aka Massacro) a 1989 Italian horror film directed by Andrea Bianchi
Massacre (franchise), three series of slasher films spanning from 1982 to 2015
The Massacre (film) 1912

Music

Groups and labels
Massacre (Argentine band), an Argentine skate punk band
Massacre (experimental band), an American experimental/rock band
Massacre (death metal band), an American death metal band
Massakre (band), a Chilean thrash metal band, or a self-titled album from the band
Massacra, a French death/thrash metal band
Massacre Records, a record label

Albums
The Massacre (The Exploited album)
The Massacre, rapper 50 Cent's second commercial album

Songs
"Massacre", a song by Escape the Fate
"Massacre", a song by Thin Lizzy
"Massacre", a song by Kim Petras from Turn Off the Light

Other uses in arts, entertainment, and media
"Massacre", Code Lyoko: Evolution episode 25
The Massacre, a 1792 play by Elizabeth Inchbald (unperformed)

Places
Massacre, Dominica, a land on the island of Dominica in the Caribbean
Massacre, Indiana, an unincorporated community in Sullivan County

Politics and news 

 Saturday Night Massacre, firing of US government officials following the Watergate scandal
 Friday Night Massacre, term used for the 2020 United States Postal Service crisis, related to Postal voting in the 2020 United States elections
 Thursday Night Massacre (Twitter), term used to describe the December 2022 Twitter suspensions

See also
Gendercide, the systematic killing of members of a specific sex
Genocide (disambiguation)
List of events named massacres

fi:Verilöyly